Novo Mundo is a municipality in the state of Mato Grosso in the Central-West Region of Brazil.

The municipality contains most of the  Cristalino State Park, created in 2001.
The municipality contains the  Cristalino II State Park, created in 2001.

See also
List of municipalities in Mato Grosso

References

Municipalities in Mato Grosso